The following is a list of the 35 cantons of the Seine-Maritime department, in France, following the French canton reorganisation which came into effect in March 2015:

 Barentin
 Bois-Guillaume
 Bolbec
 Canteleu
 Caudebec-lès-Elbeuf
 Darnétal
 Dieppe-1
 Dieppe-2
 Elbeuf
 Eu
 Fécamp
 Gournay-en-Bray
 Le Grand-Quevilly
 Le Havre-1 
 Le Havre-2 
 Le Havre-3 
 Le Havre-4 
 Le Havre-5 
 Le Havre-6 
 Luneray
 Le Mesnil-Esnard
 Mont-Saint-Aignan
 Neufchâtel-en-Bray
 Notre-Dame-de-Bondeville
 Octeville-sur-Mer
 Le Petit-Quevilly
 Port-Jérôme-sur-Seine
 Rouen-1
 Rouen-2
 Rouen-3
 Saint-Étienne-du-Rouvray
 Saint-Romain-de-Colbosc
 Saint-Valery-en-Caux
 Sotteville-lès-Rouen
 Yvetot

References